Forget About Nick is a 2017 German romantic comedy drama film directed by Margarethe von Trotta and starring Ingrid Bolsø Berdal, Katja Riemann and Haluk Bilginer.

Cast
Ingrid Bolsø Berdal as Jade
Katja Riemann as Maria
Haluk Bilginer as Nick
Tinka Fürst as Antonia
Fredrik Wagner as Whit
Mathias Sanders as Lawrence
Lucie Pohl as Lucie
Paula Riemann as Caroline
Vico Magno as Paul

References

External links
 
 

2010s English-language films
2010s German-language films
2017 romantic comedy-drama films
German romantic comedy-drama films
Films directed by Margarethe von Trotta
Warner Bros. films
2017 comedy films
2017 drama films
2010s German films